Apocleinae are a subfamily of assassin flies proposed in 1973. The proposed taxon is, however, polyphyletic and is no longer recognized as a subfamily. Most ‘Apocleinae’ genera are now included in the subfamily Asilinae.

References 

Asilidae
Brachycera subfamilies